Ralf Christoph Bernard Zumdick (born 10 May 1958) is a German former professional footballer who played as a goalkeeper. After his career (21 2. Bundesliga, 282 Bundesliga games; one goal) Zumdick was assistant coach at VfL Bochum from 1995 until 1999. Zumdick is often cited as the player who pioneered the practice of the penalty-taking-goalkeeper when he scored against Andreas Köpke in 1988. He is manager Thomas Doll's assistant coach at Ferencváros.

Career statistics

References

External links
 

1958 births
Living people
Sportspeople from Münster
German footballers
Association football goalkeepers
Bundesliga players
SC Preußen Münster players
German football managers
VfL Bochum managers
VfL Bochum players
Gençlerbirliği S.K. managers
Bundesliga managers
Persepolis F.C. non-playing staff
Germany B international footballers
Süper Lig managers
Ghana national football team managers
Footballers from North Rhine-Westphalia
German expatriate football managers
German expatriate sportspeople in Ghana
Expatriate football managers in Ghana
German expatriate sportspeople in Turkey
Expatriate football managers in Turkey